Zach Miskovic (born May 8, 1985) is an American professional ice hockey player of Croatian ancestry who is currently an unrestricted free agent. He most recently played with the Indy Fuel in the ECHL.

Professional career
On March 25, 2009, he was signed as a free agent by the Washington Capitals, and on July 15, 2010 the Capitals re-signed the restricted free agent to a further one-year contract.

Miskovic endured a painful start to the 2010–11 season after his knee was injured in July 2010 as a result of a hit from the 6-8, 262-pound Joe Finley during the Capital's development camp. The injury sidetracked his off-season training program, but the defenseman persevered to play 58 games with the Hershey Bears and scored a career-high seven goals. On May 18, 2011, the Washington Capitals rewarded Miskovic with another one-year contract extension.

On February 26, 2014, Miskovic was traded from the Rockford IceHogs to the Iowa Wild, for future considerations. He appeared in 19 games and scored one goal with the Wild to finish the season.

On July 2, 2014, Miskovic opted to return to the Rockford IceHogs, signing a one-year contract.

On September 23, 2015, Miskovic as an un-signed free agent over the summer, stayed within the IceHogs affiliation in signing a one-year contract with the Indy Fuel of the ECHL.

Career statistics

Awards and honors

References

External links

1985 births
American men's ice hockey defensemen
American people of Croatian descent
Cedar Rapids RoughRiders players
Charlotte Checkers (2010–) players
Chicago Wolves players
Cincinnati Cyclones (ECHL) players
Hershey Bears players
Ice hockey players from Illinois
Indy Fuel players
Iowa Wild players
Living people
Rockford IceHogs (AHL) players
St. Lawrence University alumni
San Antonio Rampage players
People from River Forest, Illinois
AHCA Division I men's ice hockey All-Americans